Kiska-Yelga (Qıśqayılğa) is a rural locality (a village) in Tatar-Ulkanovsky Selsoviet, Tuymazinsky District, Bashkortostan, Russia. The population was 71 as of 2010. There are 6 streets.

Geography 
Kiska-Yelga is located 13 km northeast of Tuymazy (the district's administrative centre) by road. Chvash-Ulkanovo is the nearest rural locality.

References 

Rural localities in Tuymazinsky District